Andreas Siljeström and Igor Zelenay were the defending champions, but Siljeström played alongside Frank Moser and lost to Marcel Granollers and Pere Riba in the first round, while Zelenay teamed with Mateusz Kowalczyk and also lost in the first round to Julian Knowle and Philipp Oswald.

Sergey Betov and Michail Elgin won the title, defeating Damir Džumhur and Franko Škugor in the final, 3–6, 6–1, [10–5].

Seeds

Draw

Draw

External links
 Main Draw

Sparkassen Open - Doubles
2015 Doubles